Herbert Pepper (November 14, 1912 – February 22, 2000) was a French songwriter.

Born in Brest, he was the main composer of the national anthem of Senegal, "Le Lion rouge", and that of the Central African Republic, "La Renaissance". He also served in World War II. He died in Châteauneuf-Grasse.

References

1912 births
2000 deaths
French composers